George Lewis Ahlgren (August 16, 1928 – December 30, 1951) was an American rower who competed at the 1948 Summer Olympics. He won the gold medal with the American team in the eights competition.
He attended University of California, Berkeley.  

Ahlgren was killed in an aircraft crash in Arizona while serving in the U.S. Air Force.

References

External links

1928 births
1951 deaths
Rowers at the 1948 Summer Olympics
Olympic gold medalists for the United States in rowing
American male rowers
Medalists at the 1948 Summer Olympics
Victims of aviation accidents or incidents in the United States
People from San Diego